Bleptina minimalis, the small owlet moth, is a species of litter moth in the family Erebidae. It was first described by William Barnes and James Halliday McDunnough in 1812 and it is found in North America.

The MONA or Hodges number for Bleptina minimalis is 8374.

References

Further reading

 
 
 

Herminiinae
Articles created by Qbugbot
Moths described in 1912